The Cambridge Science Festival was a series of events typically held annually in March in Cambridge, England and was the United Kingdom's largest free science festival.  In 2019 it was announced that the Cambridge Science Festival and the Cambridge Festival of Ideas would be combined into one festival. The Cambridge Festival took place for the first time in March 2020.

The festival attracts more than 30,000 visitors to over 250 events. University researchers and students open their lecture halls and laboratories to the general public, and hold Talks, Exhibitions and Demonstrations, mostly free of charge.

Started in 1994 by scientists of the University of Cambridge and backed by local businesses, the festival was inspired by National Science Week and is aimed making science and engineering more accessible, showcasing research performed at Cambridge University, and encouraging young people to pursue careers in engineering and science.

Gallery

References

External links
 Official website
 2016 planner

1994 establishments in England
March events
Science festivals
Annual events in England
Science and technology in Cambridgeshire
Culture of the University of Cambridge
Science events in the United Kingdom